The 500 Hats of Bartholomew Cubbins is a children's book, written and illustrated by Theodor Geisel under the pen name Dr. Seuss and published by Vanguard Press in 1938. Unlike the majority of Geisel's books, it is written in prose rather than rhyming and metered verse. Geisel, who collected hats, got the idea for the story on a commuter train from New York to New England, while he was sitting behind a businessman wearing a hat; the passenger was so stiff and formal that Geisel idly wondered what would happen if he took the man's hat and threw it out the window. Geisel concluded that the man was so "stuffy" that he would just grow a new one.

The characters of Bartholomew and King Derwin returned a decade later in Bartholomew and the Oobleck.

Plot summary
Set in feudal times, the story begins in the Kingdom of Didd. A young peasant, Bartholomew Cubbins, lives on the outskirts of the kingdom with his family; he wears a simple red hat with a single white feather that has remained within the family for generations. One day, Bartholomew is sent into the town to sell some berries, when he comes across King Derwin riding through a street. As per law, one is supposed to remove his or her hat when the king passes by, but Bartholomew apparently does not follow the rule, despite having a hat in his hand, and is ordered to remove the hat on his head. Bartholomew does so, but another hat mysteriously appears; when he attempts to remove this one, yet another one appears. For unknown reasons, whenever Bartholomew removes one hat, another one appears on his head.

The young boy is taken to the castle, where numerous people attempt to remove the hat from Bartholomew's head, but all attempts end in failure. The royal hatter runs away in terror, the King's young nephew fails to shoot the hats off with arrows, a great bowman similarly fails with a longbow, and Wizards attempt to curse the hat away but claim that their spell would only work in "Ten Short Years". The King, exasperated by all the attempts, sends Bartholomew to be executed, but once again the laws get in the way as a person cannot be executed by the Executioner with his or her hat on.

The King's nephew suggests throwing Bartholomew from the highest tower as a punishment. The King, while mildly upset by the idea, agrees. Bartholomew begins to push his hats off rapidly as they climb the tower. As this continues, the hats begin to grow in extravagance and beauty from the 451st hat onwards. The 451st hat has two feathers, while the 452nd hat has three and the 453rd hat has three feathers and a small gem, and so on. Ultimately the 500th hat is revealed as the greatest, studded with massive gems, plumes of feathers from rare birds and gilding, although Bartholomew seems unaware of the fact. The king is stunned by the beauty of the hat, but the nephew is more incensed than before at the sight of it. He tries to push Bartholomew off the tower against the King's wishes. But the King saves Bartholomew's life by spanking the nephew as a punishment. King Derwin grants Bartholomew a reprieve, requesting all 500 hats in exchange for 500 gold coins. Bartholomew agrees and is sent home with his massive reward, while the King keeps all the hats in a massive chest to admire for years to come. The story ends with the narrator admitting that no one knows or ever knew what caused this strange event, but it is more than likely that it will never happen again.

Reception
The book received positive reviews from critics. The New York Times reviewer called the book "a lovely bit of tomfoolery which keeps up the suspense and surprise until the end". Booklist, which had criticized Geisel's previous book, And to Think That I Saw It on Mulberry Street, for containing only enough material for one comic strip, praised The 500 Hats as "a brand-new idea, developed into a complete tale, not too long, not too short, just right. Somewhere between the Sunday supplements and the Brothers Grimm, Dr. Seuss has produced a picture book combining features of both". Alexander Laing, who had worked with Geisel on the Dartmouth Jack-O-Lantern humor magazine, wrote in his review of the book in the Dartmouth Alumni Magazine: "His several other occupations, madly fascinating as they are, may have been only preludes to a discovery of his proper vocation. That he is a rare and loopy genius has been common knowledge from an early epoch of his undergrad troubles. It now becomes plain that his is the self-consistent, happy madness beloved by children. I do not see what is to prevent him from becoming the Grimm of our times".

Adaptations
 Not long after publication, the story was adapted for an album issued by RCA Victor (Y-339). Narrated by Paul Wing, the audio adaptation had a running time of 13 minutes and 37 seconds. The dramatization featured music and sound effects on two 10" 78 rpm records in a bi-fold sleeve. 
 Geisel wrote the script for the 1943 Puppetoon short of the same name for Paramount Pictures, which was produced by George Pal. It also received a nomination for the Academy Award for Best Animated Short Film. Unlike the book's illustrations, in which Cubbins' hats were all the same one, the hats in the film were of many different kinds.
 Minnesota's Children's Theatre Company produced a version of The 500 Hats of Bartholomew Cubbins for the stage in its 1979-1980 season, and says this was the first theater adaptation of a Dr. Seuss work.

Notes

References

External links
 RCA Victor: The 500 Hats of Bartholomew Cubbins
 "Hats Off to Dr. Seuss"

Books by Dr. Seuss
1938 children's books
Vanguard Press books
Children's books adapted into films
Books adapted into plays
Fictional costumes
English-language books